Following My Own Tracks is a single by The Whitlams from their second album, Undeniably. It is one of seven songs written by Stevie Plunder on the album. Released on 2 June 1995.

Track listing
Met My Match – 3:36
Following My Own Tracks – 3:31
Pass The Flagon – 3:32
You'll Find a Way – 4:25

References

The Whitlams songs
1995 singles
Songs written by Stevie Plunder
1994 songs